Discorporation may refer to:

 Head transplant
 Incorporeality